Give My Regards to the Blonde Child on the Rhine (German: Grüß mir das blonde Kind am Rhein) is a 1926 German silent film directed by Carl Boese and starring Walter Slezak, Hanni Reinwald and Frida Richard. It takes its name from a popular song.

Cast
Walter Slezak
Hanni Reinwald
Frida Richard
Wilhelm Diegelmann
Fritz Kampers
Emil Heyse
Paula Eberty
Henry Bender

References

External links

Films of the Weimar Republic
Films directed by Carl Boese
German silent feature films
German black-and-white films
Terra Film films